, (born Kakamigahara, September 29, 1966) is a Japanese rugby union hooker and coach. Kunda played for Toshiba Brave Lupus, a team he coached to a League title victory in 2007. Originally from Gifu Prefecture, he was educated at University of Tsukuba (Tsukuba Daigaku). He served as the captain in the 1995 Rugby World Cup and is now Head Coach of the Japan U20s squad.

References

External links
Scrum.com player profile

1966 births
Living people
Japanese rugby union players
Japanese rugby union coaches
Rugby union hookers
Sportspeople from Gifu Prefecture
Japan international rugby union players
Toshiba Brave Lupus Tokyo players
Asian Games medalists in rugby union
Rugby union players at the 1998 Asian Games
Asian Games silver medalists for Japan
Medalists at the 1998 Asian Games